St Thomas More Catholic Church is a Roman Catholic church in Lordship Lane, East Dulwich, London. It was designed by Joseph Goldie in 1929 and restored in 1953 after war damage. A lady chapel was built in 1970. The stained glass is by Patrick Pye. The statue of the Madonna and Child in the Lady Chapel is by Freda Skinner.

The reredos and altar of the church are from the former chapel of the Jesuit college in Hales Place, near Canterbury, Kent.

References

External links 

20th-century Roman Catholic church buildings in the United Kingdom
Churches bombed by the Luftwaffe in London
Saint Thomas More
Edward Goldie church buildings
Roman Catholic churches in the London Borough of Southwark
Roman Catholic churches completed in 1929